McDonald Island is an island in the Sacramento-San Joaquin River Delta, 53 km (33 mi) south of Sacramento. The  island is bounded on the north by San Joaquin River, on the west by Middle River and Latham Slough, and on the south by Empire Cut. It appears unlabeled on a 1913 United States Geological Survey map of the area, and on a 1952 USGS map as "McDonald Tract".

It is in San Joaquin County, California, and managed by Reclamation District 2030.

References 

Islands of San Joaquin County, California
Islands of the Sacramento–San Joaquin River Delta
Islands of Northern California
Islands of California